Ismail Hutson (1938 – July 21, 2012), also known as Datuk Ismail Omar, was a popular movie and television actor in Malaysia. He also served as the Veteran Artistes (Acting) Welfare Association President for the last twenty years of his life, and was also the President of the Malaysian Zoological Society at the time of his death. He resided in  Taman Nusa Subang Bistari in Subang Jaya, which is in the Klang Valley of Selangor State.

Death
Hutson, suffering from a high fever, died due to heart complications on July 21, 2012, at Sime Darby Medical Centre Subang Jaya. He was surrounded by his second wife Hafidsah and his seven children when he died.

Partial List of Movie Credits
Hutson's better known movies in the Malaysian cinema include: 
Dayang Suhana (1978),
Tujuh Biang Keladi (1984),
Hantu Siang (1986),
Our Love (originally titled Cinta Kita) (1995),
Layar Lara (1998), and
Mr. Cinderella 2 (2002).

References

1938 births
2012 deaths
Malaysian male actors